Daniel Barnz (born 1970) is an American screenwriter and director.

Life and career
Barnz was born Daniel Bernstein in Gladwyne, Pennsylvania, a suburb of Philadelphia. His parents, Richard J. Bernstein and Carol L. Bernstein, are both professors. He is openly gay and later changed his surname to an amalgamation of Bernstein and Schwartz, the surname of his partner of almost two decades, Ben Schwartz. The couple has two children. Barnz describes himself as "a Jewish liberal Democrat".

Barnz graduated from Yale University and the University of Southern California Film School. He made his directorial debut in the 2001 movie, The Cutting Room. He directed the 2009 movie, Phoebe in Wonderland, which received mixed reviews from critics. He wrote and directed a movie adaption of the novel Beastly, a modern-day take on Beauty and the Beast. The movie was released on 4 March 2011.

His film Won't Back Down (2012) received mixed reviews and garnered controversy; it was attacked by Randi Weingarten, head of the American Federation of Teachers (AFT), the predominant national teachers' union, as having "the most blatant stereotypes and caricatures I have ever seen-even worse than in Waiting for Superman", another film attacked as "anti-teacher union".

In 2014 he directed the film Cake starring Jennifer Aniston, which received mixed reviews. In 2015, the film was honored by the Substance Abuse and Mental Health Services Administration with a Voice Award for its respectful portrayal of mental health.

Filmography

References

External links
 

1970 births
American male screenwriters
Living people
LGBT film directors
LGBT Jews
LGBT people from Pennsylvania
American LGBT screenwriters
People from Lower Merion Township, Pennsylvania
Date of birth missing (living people)
Film directors from Pennsylvania
Jewish American writers
Yale University alumni
USC School of Cinematic Arts alumni
Screenwriters from Pennsylvania
21st-century American Jews
21st-century American LGBT people